Alistair King was a Scottish professional Grand Prix motorcycle road racer. His best season was in 1961 when he finished the year in fifth place in the 500cc world championship. In 1954 he won the Isle of Man Clubmans Senior TT. King finished second to John Surtees in the 1959 Isle of Man Senior TT and won the 350cc Formula One TT. He was also a two-time winner of the 350 class at the North West 200 race held in Northern Ireland.

References

Year of birth missing (living people)
Living people
Scottish motorcycle racers
350cc World Championship riders
500cc World Championship riders
Isle of Man TT riders
Place of birth missing (living people)